Edith Yorke (born Edith Murgatroyd; 23 December 1867 – 28 July 1934) was an English actress. She appeared in more than 60 films between 1919 and 1933.

Biography
Yorke was born in Derby; her family later moved to Croydon, Surrey. Edith returned to Derby, where she taught destitute children in a local workhouse. 

She married Robert Byard and emigrated with him and their children to the United States in 1902, becoming a film actress in her 50s, mainly in supporting roles. Her daughter was a film actress also, and her son became a violinist with a symphony orchestra. Yorke died in Southgate, California, aged 66.

Selected filmography

 The False Road (1920)
 Below the Surface (1920)
 The Jailbird (1920)
 Love (1920)
 One Clear Call (1922)
 Step on It! (1922)
 Souls for Sale (1923)
 Slippy McGee (1923)
 Merry-Go-Round (1923)
 The Age of Desire (1923)
 Burning Words (1923)
The Fourth Musketeer (1923)
 The Miracle Makers (1923)
 The Beauty Prize (1924)
 Happiness (1924)
 Riders Up (1924)
 The Tenth Woman (1924)
 The Other Kind of Love (1924)
 Capital Punishment (1925)
 Excuse Me  (1925)
 Silent Sanderson (1925)
 Wild Horse Mesa (1925)
 Souls for Sables (1925)
 Below the Line (1925)
 Seven Keys to Baldpate (1925)
 Red Dice (1926)
 His New York Wife (1926)
 Volcano! (1926)
 The Belle of Broadway (1926)
 Oh! What a Nurse! (1926)
 Rustlers' Ranch (1926)
 Rustling for Cupid (1926)
 The Silent Flyer (1926)
 The Bachelor's Baby (1927)
 Sensation Seekers (1927)
 The Port of Missing Girls (1928)
 The Valiant (1929)
 The Love Racket (1929)
 Fugitives (1929)
 Seven Keys to Baldpate (1929)
 City Girl (1930)
 If I Had a Million (1932) (*uncredited)
 Luxury Liner (1933)

References

External links

1867 births
1934 deaths
English film actresses
English silent film actresses
People from Derby
20th-century English actresses